Kim Jin-woo (born October 23, 1971), better known by his stage name Jinu, is an American rapper, singer, songwriter, and  entrepreneur. He debuted in 1994 as a solo singer before teaming up with Sean to create a hip-hop duo Jinusean in 1997 under YG Entertainment.

Early life 
Kim was born in California. He is fluent in English and Korean.

Career

1994: Solo debut 
On March 9, 1994, Kim Jin-woo released his first album "Kim Jin Woo Vol. 1" with "I Am Awesome" as his first single. After hearing about his album, Yang Hyun-suk, former Seo Taiji and Boys' member, pick Kim Jin-woo to be in a hip hop duo under his label, YG Entertainment with Sean.

1997: Jinusean debut 
Jinu and Sean debuted as Jinusean with the single, "Gasoline," in 1997 under the guidance of YG Entertainment CEO and former Seo Taiji and Boys member Yang Hyun-suk and former Deux member Lee Hyun Do. Their second single, "Tell Me" (featuring singer Uhm Jung-hwa), was the duo's first hit and propelled them to stardom.

2004–present: Extended hiatus and Work at YG Entertainment 
Between 2004 and 2014, the duo went on an extended hiatus. They remained at YG Entertainment working in various behind-the-scenes roles. Jinu was appointed as the Director of Overseas Operations. He was in charge of matters overseas including auditions and concerts. He discovered Bobby of iKon in New York then brought him to Korea to train under YG Entertainment.

In 2014, Jinusean made his first appearance in 10 years on a Korean variety TV show called Infinite Challenge.  In 2015, they released the single "Tell Me One More Time" which marked the end of their hiatus.

As of 2018, Jinu is confirmed to star in a new series by Netflix and YG Entertainment, YG Future Strategy Office.

Personal life 
He is the grandson of Nam June Paik, a Korean-American artist, with his first wife.

On May 14, 2006, Jinu married actress Kim Jun-hee. They divorced in 2008, after two years of marriage due to irreconcilable differences.

Kim is a Christian.

Discography

Solo album

Singles

As a lead artist

As a featured artist

Filmography

References

External links 

1971 births
Living people
American musicians of Korean descent
Rappers from California
21st-century American rappers